Manuele Malotti (born 24 April 1997) is an Italian professional footballer who plays as a winger for  club Renate.

Career
On 19 September 2020, he joined Serie C club Sambenedettese.

On 12 August 2021, he signed with Teramo in Serie C.

On 11 August 2022, Malotti moved to Renate on a two-year deal.

References

External links
 
 

1997 births
Living people
Footballers from Florence
Italian footballers
Association football wingers
Serie C players
Serie D players
Eccellenza players
A.C. Prato players
U.S. Gavorrano players
A.C. Tuttocuoio 1957 San Miniato players
Aglianese Calcio 1923 players
A.S. Sambenedettese players
Novara F.C. players
S.S. Teramo Calcio players
A.C. Renate players